Amblystomus is a genus of beetles in the family Carabidae, containing the following species:

 Amblystomus aeneolus (Chaudoir, 1876)
 Amblystomus aenescens (Motschulsky, 1858) 
 Amblystomus alberti Basilewsky, 1951 
 Amblystomus algirinus Reitter, 1887
 Amblystomus amabilis (Boheman, 1848) 
 Amblystomus anthracinus (Sloane, 1898) 
 Amblystomus anthracinus (Sloane, 1898) 
 Amblystomus australis Motschulsky, 1864 
 Amblystomus basalis Peringuey, 1896 
 Amblystomus bayeri Burgeon, 1935 
 Amblystomus bilineatus G.Muller, 1942 
 Amblystomus biplagiatus G.Muller, 1942 
 Amblystomus bivittatus Andrewes, 1919
 Amblystomus blandus Peringuey, 1896 
 Amblystomus breviceps Andrewes, 1947 
 Amblystomus capensis (Motschulsky, 1864) 
 Amblystomus cephalotes Reitter, 1896
 Amblystomus chalceus Andrewes, 1939 
 Amblystomus colasi Basilewsky, 1948 
 Amblystomus convexus (W.S.Macleay, 1825) 
 Amblystomus cuneatus Landin, 1955 
 Amblystomus decaryi Alluaud, 1935 
 Amblystomus dispar Basilewsky, 1951 
 Amblystomus dorsiger G.Muller, 1942 
 Amblystomus dromioides Bates, 1889 
 Amblystomus eburneus Basilewsky, 1951 
 Amblystomus eduardinus Burgeon, 1935 
 Amblystomus escorialensis Gautier Des Cottes, 1866
 Amblystomus femoralis (Motschulsky, 1858) 
 Amblystomus flavipes (Motschulsky, 1858) 
 Amblystomus fuscescens (Motschulsky, 1858) 
 Amblystomus gagatinus (Macleay, 1871) 
 Amblystomus geayi Alluaud, 1935 
 Amblystomus gracilis (Blackburn, 1888) 
 Amblystomus guttatus Bates, 1873
 Amblystomus guttula (Dejean, 1831) 
 Amblystomus hessei Basilewsky, 1948 
 Amblystomus ignobilis Andrewes, 1947 
 Amblystomus imerinae (Jeannel, 1948) 
 Amblystomus indicus (Nietner, 1858) 
 Amblystomus indotatus Basilewsky, 1946 
 Amblystomus inflaticeps Andrewes, 1947 
 Amblystomus intermedius Peringuey, 1899 
 Amblystomus iranicus Jedlicka, 1961
 Amblystomus jeanneli Basilewsky, 1948 
 Amblystomus katanganus Burgeon, 1935 
 Amblystomus laetus (Blackburn, 1888) 
 Amblystomus latefasciatus Basilewsky, 1963 
 Amblystomus laticeps Andrewes, 1933 
 Amblystomus latus Andrewes, 1947 
 Amblystomus lepineyi Alluaud, 1934 
 Amblystomus levantinus Reitter, 1883
 Amblystomus louwerensi Landin, 1955 
 Amblystomus mauritanicus (Dejean, 1829)
 Amblystomus metallescens (Dejean, 1829)
 Amblystomus metallicus (Blackburn, 1888) 
 Amblystomus metrius Basilewsky, 1951 
 Amblystomus minimus (Dejean, 1829) 
 Amblystomus minutulus Basilewsky, 1946 
 Amblystomus minutus (Castelnau, 1867)
 Amblystomus montanus (Blackburn, 1891) 
 Amblystomus natalicus Peringuey, 1896 
 Amblystomus niger (Heer, 1841)
 Amblystomus nigrinus Csiki, 1931 
 Amblystomus nigrofemoratus Basilewsky, 1946 
 Amblystomus nitidiceps G.Muller, 1942 
 Amblystomus notabilis Landin, 1955 
 Amblystomus obliquus (Sloane, 1898) 
 Amblystomus omoxanthus Basilewsky, 1948 
 Amblystomus ornatipennis (Boheman, 1848) 
 Amblystomus orpheus (Laferte-Senectere, 1853)
 Amblystomus ovalis (Sloane, 1900) 
 Amblystomus pallidicolor G.Muller, 1942 
 Amblystomus pallipes (Motschulsky, 1858) 
 Amblystomus palustris (Blackburn, 1888) 
 Amblystomus parvus (Blackburn, 1888) 
 Amblystomus photophilus Basilewsky, 1948 
 Amblystomus picinus Baudi Di Selva, 1864
 Amblystomus posticalis Basilewsky, 1953 
 Amblystomus pulchellus G.Muller, 1942 
 Amblystomus punctatus Bates, 1892 
 Amblystomus quadriguttatus (Motschulsky, 1858) 
 Amblystomus quadrillum (Dejean, 1829) 
 Amblystomus quadrinotatus (Dejean, 1831) 
 Amblystomus quadripustulatus Jeannel, 1948 
 Amblystomus quadrisignatus (Boheman, 1848) 
 Amblystomus raymondi Gautier Des Cottes, 1861
 Amblystomus rectangulus Reitter, 1883
 Amblystomus regularis Landin, 1955 
 Amblystomus resectus Andrewes, 1924 
 Amblystomus rotundiceps Bates, 1892 
 Amblystomus rutshuruanus Basilewsky, 1951 
 Amblystomus scitus Peringuey, 1896 
 Amblystomus seriepunctatus Basilewsky, 1948 
 Amblystomus seyrigi Alluaud, 1935 
 Amblystomus similis Landin, 1955 
 Amblystomus sloanei Andrewes, 1936 
 Amblystomus somalicus Basilewsky, 1948 
 Amblystomus stenolophoides (Nietner, 1858) 
 Amblystomus striatus Landin, 1955 
 Amblystomus subviridulus Basilewsky, 1948 
 Amblystomus sudanicus Basilewsky, 1946 
 Amblystomus suspectus Landin, 1955 
 Amblystomus suturellus Basilewsky, 1963 
 Amblystomus suturifer G.Muller, 1942 
 Amblystomus tchadicus Basilewsky, 1948 
 Amblystomus tetrasemus (Chaudoir, 1878) 
 Amblystomus umbrifer (Chaudoir, 1876) 
 Amblystomus umbrinus Landin, 1955 
 Amblystomus versicolor Basilewsky, 1948
 Amblystomus villiersanus Bruneau De Mire, 1991 
 Amblystomus villiersi Basilewsky, 1964 
 Amblystomus viridulus (Erichson, 1843) 
 Amblystomus vittipennis (Boheman, 1848) 
 Amblystomus vulneratus (Dejean, 1831) 
 Amblystomus zambezianus Basilewsky, 1948

References

Harpalinae